6th Nova Scotia general election may refer to:

Nova Scotia general election, 1785, the 6th general election to take place in the Colony of Nova Scotia, for the 6th General Assembly of Nova Scotia
Nova Scotia general election, 1886, the 28th overall general election for Nova Scotia, for the (due to a counting error in 1859) 29th Legislative Assembly of Nova Scotia, but considered the 6th general election for the Canadian province of Nova Scotia